Jonas Kaufmann (born 10 July 1969) is a German-Austrian tenor opera singer. He is best known for the versatility of his repertoire, performing a variety of opera roles in multiple languages in recital and concert each season. Some of his standout roles include Don José in Carmen, Cavaradossi in Tosca, Maurizio in Adriana Lecouvreur, Don Alvaro in La forza del destino, Siegmund in Die Walküre, and the title roles in Parsifal, Werther, Don Carlos, and Lohengrin. In 2014 The New York Times described Kaufmann as "a box-office draw, and... the most important, versatile tenor of his generation."

Early life and education
Kaufmann was born in Munich. His father worked for an insurance company, and his mother was a kindergarten teacher. He had one older sister. He started studying piano when he was eight, and he sang in his elementary school choir. Although he studied for mathematics entrance exams, in the summer of 1989 he began his vocal training at the University of Music and Performing Arts Munich. While he was studying, he sang some small roles at the Bavarian State Opera. He graduated from university in 1994, achieving distinctions in both opera and concert performances.

In 1995, Kaufmann received help from American baritone Michael Rhodes, who taught him a "new way of singing" and how to become "more relaxed in my voice and in myself." In Kaufmann's book Meinen die wirklich mich? he said, "To find a Michael Rhodes that can really help you and bring you to success is really a great stroke of luck."

Career

He began his professional career at the Staatstheater Saarbrücken in 1994 and was soon invited to make debuts in German theaters such as the Stuttgart Opera and Hamburg State Opera, as well as international debuts at the Lyric Opera of Chicago, Opéra National de Paris, and La Scala. He made his Salzburg Festival debut in 1999 in a new production of Busoni's Doktor Faust and returned there in 2003 as Belmonte in Mozart's Die Entführung aus dem Serail and for concerts of Beethoven's Ninth Symphony with the Berlin Philharmonic.

He performed the role of Don José in Bizet's Carmen, to critical acclaim, at the Royal Opera House, Covent Garden, in 2006/7. He made his debut as Alfredo in Verdi's La traviata at the Metropolitan Opera alongside Angela Gheorghiu in 2006, also to critical acclaim, and also sang the role at the Met  in 2007 and 2008, and at the Royal Opera House in 2008. In May 2008, he played Cavaradossi in Puccini's Tosca at Covent Garden, yet again to critical acclaim.

In 2008/9, he performed in Massenet's Manon in Chicago opposite Natalie Dessay and in the title role of a new production of Wagner's Lohengrin at the Bavarian State Opera. He also sang Lohengrin on the opening night of the Bayreuth Festival in 2010, in a production staged by Hans Neuenfels and conducted by Andris Nelsons.

His debut recording with Decca, Romantic Arias, was released in January 2008. He has also recorded a Schubert song cycle on the same label and the role of Pinkerton in Puccini's Madama Butterfly for EMI.

In January 2010, he took the title role in Massenet's Werther at the Opéra Bastille in Paris. The performance was recorded and released on DVD in November 2010.

In April 2011, he returned to the Metropolitan Opera as Siegmund in Robert Lepage's new production of Wagner's Die Walküre. In September 2011, he underwent surgery to remove a lymph node from his chest. In December, he was back, performing the title role in Gounod's Faust.

On 15 February 2013, Kaufmann made his first appearance in the title role of Wagner's Parsifal at the Metropolitan Opera. His performance received rave reviews from critics. In July of that year he was named a Kammersänger of the Bavarian State Opera by the Bavarian Ministry of Arts. In December he sang the role of Don Alvaro in Verdi's La forza del destino with the company.

In February 2014, Kaufmann sang the title role in Massenet's Werther at the Met. He followed this by touring with Schubert's song cycle Winterreise with Helmut Deutsch. In June 2014, he made his debut in the role of Des Grieux in Puccini's Manon Lescaut at the Royal Opera House in London. That November he sang the same role in another production of Manon Lescaut at the Bavarian State Opera.

On 12 September 2015, Kaufmann became the first German singer to perform the British patriotic song "Rule, Britannia!" at the Last Night of The Proms.

On 23 February 2016, the documentary Jonas Kaufmann: An Evening with Puccini was released in selected theaters in the United States. The film centered around Kaufmann's 2015 performance at La Scala in Milan and featured rare archive footage.

In 2018, Kaufmann made his debut as Tristan in concert performances of the second act of Wagner's Tristan und Isolde.

In 2019, the concert stage saw Kaufmann tour Germany with Mahler's “Lied von der Erde”, and performances from his “L'Opéra” CD. Operatic highlights include Fidelio and Otello at the Bayerische Staatsoper; La Forza del destino at the Royal Opera House in London; Andrea Chenier in Sydney and Melbourne and a new production of Die Tote Stadt in Munich.

Highlights from 2020 included a tour of Kaufmann's album "Mein Wien", Aida at the Teatro San Carlo in Napoli; Don Carlos at the Wiener Staatsoper; La Bohème at the Bayerische Staatsoper; and Cavalleria Rusticana at the Teatro San Carlo in Napoli.

In 2021, Kaufmann gave recitals in Madrid and Vienna; sung in new productions of Aida in Paris and Parsifal in Vienna; and had his full role debut as Tristan at the Bayerische Staatsoper. Kaufmann also embarked on a tour of North America, accompanied by pianist Helmut Deutsch.

Kaufmann commenced the year 2022 with a role debut as the titular role in Britten's Peter Grimes at the Wiener Staatsoper.
In March 2022, a studio recording of Turandot was organized by Antonio Pappano at the Santa Cecilia auditorium. Jonas Kaufmann sang the role of Calaf for the first time there alongside Sondra Radvanovsky in the title role. A public concert was performed on 12 March 2022 in Rome.
After Turandot Kaufmann undertakes a tour of eleven concerts of Lieder by Brahms and Schumann with Diana Damrau and her usual pianist Helmut Deutsch, in various European cities, including Berlin, Munich, Paris, London. He made his role debut as Calaf (Turandot) in Rome with the Accademia Nazionale di Santa Cecilia orchestra, conducted by Pappano, performed Mario Cavaradossi (Tosca) at Teatro San Carlo in Naples, the title role in Lohengrin at Melbourne Opera, and made his operatic debut at the Arena di Verona, performing Radames in Aïda.

To begin the 2022/23 season, Kaufmann returns to the Bayerische Staatsoper to perform the title role in Britten's Peter Grimes. To commence the New Year, he performs the role of Radames in Verdi's Aida at the Wiener Staatsoper alongside Anna Netrebko and Elīna Garanča.

Personal life
Kaufmann has been married twice. His first marriage to mezzo-soprano Margarete Joswig produced three children, and ended in divorce. His second marriage is to the opera director Christiane Lutz. The couple married in late 2018, and have a child, born in March 2019.

Kaufmann has German and Austrian dual citizenship, with Austrian citizenship awarded to him in Feb. 2021. His current main residence is in Salzburg.

Discography

Audio

DVDs
 2002: Monteverdi – Il ritorno d'Ulisse in patria (Jonas Kaufmann / Vesselina Kasarova / Dietrich Henschel / Isabel Rey)
 2002: Paisiello – Nina (Jonas Kaufmann / Cecilia Bartoli / László Polgár)
 2004: Beethoven – Fidelio (Jonas Kaufmann / Camilla Nylund / László Polgár / Alfred Muff / Elizabeth Magnuson / Christoph Strehl)
 2005: Mozart – La clemenza di Tito (Jonas Kaufmann / Vesselina Kasarova / Eva Mei / Malin Hartelius)
 2006: Bizet – Carmen (Jonas Kaufmann / Anna Caterina Antonacci / Ildebrando D'Arcangelo / Norah Amsellem)
 2006: Schubert – Fierrabras (Jonas Kaufmann / Juliane Banse / Michael Volle / Christoph Strehl / László Polgár)
 2008: Bizet – Carmen (Jonas Kaufmann / Vesselina Kasarova / Isabel Rey / Michele Pertusi)
 2009: R. Strauss – Der Rosenkavalier (Renée Fleming / Sophie Koch / Diana Damrau / Franz Hawlata / Jonas Kaufmann)
 2009: Wagner – Lohengrin (Jonas Kaufmann / Anja Harteros / Wolfgang Koch / Michaela Schuster / Christof Fischesser / Evgeny Nikitin)
 2010: Massenet – Werther (Jonas Kaufmann / Sophie Koch / Michel Plasson)
 2010: Humperdinck – Königskinder (Jonas Kaufmann / Isabel Rey / Oilver Widmer / Liliana Nikiteanu)
 2010: Cilea – Adriana Lecouvreur (Jonas Kaufmann / Angela Gheorghiu / Olga Borodina / Alessandro Corbelli)
 2011: Puccini – Tosca (Jonas Kaufmann / Emily Magee / Thomas Hampson)
 2011: Wagner – Die Walküre (Jonas Kaufmann / Eva-Maria Westbroek / Deborah Voigt / Bryn Terfel)
 2011: Gounod – Faust (Jonas Kaufmann / Marina Poplavskaya / René Pape)
 2011: Wagner – Der Ring des Nibelungen (Jonas Kaufmann / Bryn Terfel / Deborah Voigt / Jay Hunter Morris / Eva-Maria Westbroek)
 2012: R.Strauss – Ariadne auf Naxos (Jonas Kaufmann / Emily Magee / Elena Moșuc / Peter Matić / Cornelius Obonya)
 2012: Puccini – Tosca (Angela Gheorghiu / Jonas Kaufmann / Bryn Terfel / Antonio Pappano)
 2012: Verdi – Requiem (Jonas Kaufmann / Anja Harteros / Elīna Garanča / René Pape)
 2013: Wagner – Parsifal (Jonas Kaufmann / René Pape / Peter Mattei / Katarina Dalayman / Evgeny Nikitin / Daniele Gatti / François Girard)
 2013: Puccini – La fanciulla del West (Jonas Kaufmann / Nina Stemme / Tomasz Konieczny)
 2013: Verdi – Don Carlo (Jonas Kaufmann / Anja Harteros / Matti Salminen / Thomas Hampson / Ekaterina Semenchuk)
 2014: Puccini – Manon Lescaut (Jonas Kaufmann / Kristine Opolais)
 2014: Verdi – La Forza del destino (Jonas Kaufmann / Anja Harteros)
 2015: Mascagni – Cavalleria rusticana (Jonas Kaufmann / Liudmyla Monastyrska) & Leoncavallo – Pagliacci (Jonas Kaufmann / Maria Agresta)
 2015: Giordano – Andrea Chenier (Jonas Kaufmann / Eva-Marie Westbroek)
 2016: Opera Gala Baden Baden – Gala Summer (Jonas Kaufmann / Bryn Terfel)
 2017: Verdi – Otello (Jonas Kaufmann / Maria Agresta / Claudio Sgura
 2021: Korngold –  Die Tote Stadt (Jonas Kaufmann/Marlis Petersen)

Repertoire

Kaufmann's repertoire includes the following:

ITALIAN

FRENCH

GERMAN

ENGLISH

Awards
 2007 Gramophone Award 2007, Strauss-Lieder, CD
 2008 Grands prix internationaux du disque, Diapason d’or, Romantic Arias, CD
 2008 Qobus/Classica: Le meilleur disque de 2008, Romantic Arias, CD
 2009 Gramophone Award 2009, Madame Butterfly, CD
 2009 Prix Caecilia 2009, Sehnsucht, CD
 2009 Diapason d’or 2009, Romantic Arias, CD
 2010 ECHO Klassik „Bester Sänger des Jahres“ for the recording Sehnsucht
 2010 Orphée d’or „Wolfgang Wagner“ 2010, Sehnsucht, CD
 2010 Diapason d’or 2010, Die schöne Müllerin, CD
 2010 Diapason d’or 2010, Verismo Arias, CD
 2011 Gramophone Award 2011, Verismo Arias, CD
 2011 Diapason d’or 2011, Werther, DVD
 2012 Medal for "besondere Verdienste um Bayern in einem Vereinten Europa"
 2012 Gramophone Award 2012, Fidelio, CD
 2013 International Opera Awards: Opera Magazine Readers Award
 2013 International Opera Awards: The Male Singer of the Year Award
 2013 Die Goldene Deutschland
 2013 Bayerischer Kammersänger – awarded at the end of the performance of Il trovatore, 8 July 2013
 2013 ECHO Klassik „Sänger des Jahres“ for the recording Kaufmann Wagner
 2013 ECHO Klassik „Operneinspielung des Jahres“ (19. Jh.): Mariinsky Orchestra/Valery Gergiev, Wagner: Die Walküre
 2013 ECHO Klassik „Musik-DVD-Produktion des Jahres“: Robert Lepage/Deutsche Grammophon, Der Ring des Nibelungen
 2013 Gramophone Award 2013, Wagner, CD
 2014 Golden plate for the Verdi-Album awarded at the end of the Liederabends Winterreise in Graz am 4. April 2014
 2014 ECHO Klassik „Solistische Einspielung des Jahres/Gesang“ (The Verdi Album)
 2014 Gramophone Classical Music Award 2014 Solo Vocal (Schubert – Winterreise, Jonas Kaufmann and Helmut Deutsch)
 2014 Bambi for the category "Classical Music“
 2015 International Opera Awards
 2015 ECHO Klassik „Sänger des Jahres“ for the recording Du bist die Welt für mich
 2015 Premio Puccini 2015
 2016 "Service Cross" for the order of the Bundesrepublik Deutschland
 2016 ECHO Klassik „Bestseller des Jahres“ for the Puccini-Album Nessun Dorma
 2016 Jahrespreis for the recording of Aida (2015) at the Preis der Deutschen Schallplattenkritik
 2017 ECHO Klassik „Bestseller des Jahres“ or the album Dolce Vita
 2018 Officier de l'Ordre des Arts et des Lettres
 2018 Bavarian Maximilian Order for Science and Art
 2019 Goldener Rathausmann der Stadt Wien
 2020 Honorary Doctorate at the Royal College of Music, give by Prince Charles
 2020 Opus Klassik, in the category "Classic without boarders" for his album Wien
 2021 Österreichischer Musiktheaterpreis – Special Media Prize
 2021 Opus Klassik in the category "Opera Recording of the Year" for Otello
 2022: Award of Professional title Austrian Kammersänger
 2022: Opus Klassik in the category "Singer of the Year" for Liszt: Feudvoll und Leidvoll
 2022: Bayerischer Verfassungsorden

Literature
 Thomas Voigt: Jonas Kaufmann: In Conversation With. Weidenfeld & Nicolson, 2017, .
 Thomas Voigt and Christine Cerletti: Jonas Kaufmann: Eine Bilderreise. Stiftung Colla Parte Basel, 2019,

References

Further reading

External links

 
 Jonas Kaufmann on bach-cantatas
 Marie d'Origny (26 April 2012). "The Tenor on Stage: An Interview with Jonas Kaufmann". The New York Review of Books (includes a video of his 1998 performance in Così fan tutte at the Piccolo Teatro in Milan)

1969 births
Living people
Musicians from Munich
German operatic tenors
20th-century German male opera singers
21st-century German male opera singers
Recipients of the Cross of the Order of Merit of the Federal Republic of Germany
Österreichischer Kammersänger